Marib District is a district of the Ma'rib Governorate, Yemen. As of 2003, the district had a population of 39,495 inhabitants.

On August 7, 2013, a US drone strike in Al-Mil, killed two Civilians including one child according to the report Death by Drone, authored by Radhya Al-Mukatawel and Abdulrasheed Al-Faqih of Mwatana, jointly with the Open Societies Foundations.

Villages
 

Asdas

References

Districts of Marib Governorate